One Touch of Venus is a 1948 American black-and-white romantic musical comedy film directed by William A. Seiter starring Robert Walker, Ava Gardner, Dick Haymes, and Eve Arden. released by Universal-International, and based on the 1943 Broadway musical of the same name, book written by S. J. Perelman and Ogden Nash, with music composed by Kurt Weill (lyrics by Nash). However, the film omits most of Weill's music. The actors did their own singing, except for Ava Gardner (Venus) whose singing was dubbed by Eileen Wilson. The plot is from an original 1885 novella by Thomas Anstey Guthrie.

In 1945, Mary Pickford announced that she would produce a film version of this musical with the Broadway cast, including Mary Martin, filmed in Technicolor, directed by Gregory La Cava, and released by United Artists. However, Martin became pregnant and Pickford sold the rights to Lester Cowan at Universal in August 1947. Ann Ronell, Cowan's wife, wrote the additional music that replaced much of Weill's material.

This movie is rumored to be the inspiration for the 1987 film Mannequin.

Plot
Wealthy department-store mogul Whitfield Savory II buys a statue of Venus for $200,000. He plans to exhibit it in the store. Eddie Hatch, a window dresser, kisses the statue on a whim. To his shock, Venus comes to life. She leaves the store and Eddie is accused of stealing the work of art. Nobody believes the truth, including secretary Molly Stewart, who is Savory's right-hand woman, and Kerrigan, a detective. Venus turns up at Eddie's apartment, forcing him to hide her from girlfriend Gloria and roommate Joe.

Entranced by a Venus song of love, Joe falls for Eddie's girl Gloria. At the store, meanwhile, Venus has fallen asleep on a sofa and is discovered there by Whitfield, who is instantly smitten. Kerrigan decides it's time for Eddie to be placed under arrest for the statue's theft. Venus, to save Eddie, is willing to seduce Whitfield, but a threat by Molly to leave him brings Whitfield back to his senses. He realizes it's Molly he truly loves. Venus is called home by Jupiter and must return to Mount Olympus, so she returns to her pedestal. Whitfield can now display his work of art to the public. Eddie is the only one left alone, at least until he meets a new salesgirl who is a dead ringer for the goddess of love.

Cast
 Robert Walker as Eddie Hatch
 Ava Gardner as Venus/Venus Jones 
 Dick Haymes as Joe Grant
 Eve Arden as Molly Stewart
 Olga San Juan as Gloria
 Tom Conway as Whitfield Savory
 James Flavin as Kerrigan
 Sara Allgood as Landlady
 George J. Lewis as Detective #2 (uncredited)

The statue of Venus
To achieve a realistic-looking living statue, the studio sent Ava Gardner to sculptor Joseph Nicolosi. Gardner posed in a bikini but the drape of the top seemed wrong to the sculptor, so Gardner removed her bikini top and Nicolosi continued with his sculpture. Nicolosi was not aware that the sculpture had to resemble a Venus in Grecian robes, and when he presented the work to the studio he was forced to change it accordingly for the film. However, the studio had 12-inch tall copies of the Nicolosi sculpture made in Bakelite and presented them as promotional items to theater owners and members of the media.

Accolades
The film is recognized by American Film Institute in these lists:
 2002: AFI's 100 Years...100 Passions – Nominated

Song list
"Don't Look Now But My Heart is Showing" – played over opening credits and sung by a chorus
"Speak Low" – sung by Ava Gardner (dubbed by Eileen Wilson) and Dick Haymes
"That's Him" – sung by Ava Gardner (dubbed by Eileen Wilson), Olga San Juan and Eve Arden
"Don't Look Now But My Heart is Showing" (reprise) – sung by Dick Haymes, Olga San Juan, Robert Walker, Ava Gardner (dubbed by Eileen Wilson) and chorus
"Speak Low" (reprise) – sung by Ava Gardner (dubbed by Eileen Wilson)

References

External links 
 
 
 

1948 films
1948 musical comedy films
1948 romantic comedy films
1940s fantasy comedy films
American fantasy comedy films
American musical comedy films
American romantic comedy films
American romantic fantasy films
American romantic musical films
American black-and-white films
1940s English-language films
Films based on musicals
Films directed by William A. Seiter
Films set in department stores
Universal Pictures films
Films with screenplays by Harry Kurnitz
Films with screenplays by Frank Tashlin
Films based on classical mythology
1940s American films